Philip Havelock Davies  (30 August 1893 – 30 January 1930) was an English cricketer active from 1913 to 1927 who played for Sussex. He was born in Brighton and died in Catterick Camp. He appeared in 27 first-class matches as a righthanded batsman who bowled right arm slow. He scored 286 runs with a highest score of 55 and took 98 wickets with a best performance of six for 59.

Notes

External links
Obituaries in 1930 – Wisden

1893 births
1930 deaths
Sportspeople from Brighton
English cricketers
Sussex cricketers
Oxford University cricketers
British Army cricketers
Gentlemen of England cricketers
People educated at Brighton College
Alumni of The Queen's College, Oxford
Military personnel from Sussex